Diphyoropa saturni, also known as the Sydney copper pinwheel snail, is a species of pinwheel snail that is endemic to eastern Australia.

Description
The shell of mature snails is 1.6–1.8 mm in height, with a diameter of 3.2–3.5 mm, discoidal with a flat to slightly sunken spire, with rounded whorls, impressed sutures and widely spaced radial ribs. It is uniformly coppery-brown in colouration. The umbilicus is widely open. The aperture is ovately lunate. The animal has a white body.

Distribution
The snail has a natural range extending from south-eastern Queensland to south-eastern New South Wales. It has been introduced to Victoria and Lord Howe Island.

References

 
 

 
saturni
Gastropods of Australia
Gastropods of Lord Howe Island
Taxa named by James Charles Cox
Gastropods described in 1864